Wheelchair basketball at the 2012 Summer Paralympics was held from 30 August to 8 September. Competitions were held at the newly built Basketball Arena, which seated 10,000 spectators, and The O2 Arena (renamed "North Greenwich Arena" during the games due to sponsorship rules). Australia were the defending champions of the men's championship, while the United States were the defending champions of the women's championship.

Competition format 
In the men's tournament, twelve qualified nations were drawn into two groups, each consisting of six teams, where each team met the other teams once. The four highest placed teams in each group then advanced to a knock-out round to decide the medals and 4th to 8th places. The fifth-placed teams met each other over the 9th and 10th places, and the sixth-placed teams met each other over the 11th and 12th places.

In the women's tournament, ten qualified nations were drawn into two groups, each consisting of five teams, where each team met the other teams once. The four highest placed teams in each group then advanced to a knock-out round to decide the medals and 4th to 8th places. The fifth-placed teams met each other over the 9th and 10th places.

Athlete classification 
Athletes are given an eight-level score specific to wheelchair basketball, ranging from 0.5 to 4.5. Lower scores represented a higher degree of disability. The sum score of all players on the court cannot exceed 14.

Qualification 
The Great Britain wheelchair basketball teams received automatic qualification as hosts. An NPC may enter up to one men's team with 12 players and up to one women's team with 12 players.

Men

Women

Medalists 

Source: Paralympic.org

See also 
Basketball at the 2012 Summer Olympics

References 

Qualification Criteria - Wheelchair Basketball, International Paralympic Committee (IPC)

External links 
Wheelchair Basketball , at The Official Website of London 2012
International Wheelchair Basketball Federation (IWBF)

 
2012
wheelchair basketball
Paralympics
International basketball competitions hosted by the United Kingdom
2012–13 in British basketball
Basketball in London